This is a list of holidays in Tunisia.

 January 1: New Year's Day
 March 20: Independence Day
 April 9: Martyrs' Day
 May 1: Labour Day
 July 25: Republic Day
 August 13: Women's Day
 October 15: Evacuation Day
 December 17: Revolution Day
Eid al-Fitr
Eid al-Adha 
Islamic New Year
Mawlid

References 

Tunisian culture
Tunisia
Holidays
Tunisia